Balayogini ( Girl Saint) is a 1937 Indian film made in Tamil and Telugu languages. It was directed by K. Subramanyam. It is one of the earliest Tamil films to be set in a contemporary social setting and to advocate reformist social policies. This film is considered to be first children's talkie film of South India.

Production 
Subramanyam, was influenced by the reformist ideals of his father C.V. Krishnaswamy Iyer. He was moved by the social conditions around him to make reform oriented films. Balayogini (lit. Child Saint) was made to expose the plight and suffering of widows in middle class Brahmin communities in Tamil Nadu. Subramanyam produced this film under his "Madras United Artists Corporation" banner to express his criticism of the existing social norms and his disapproval of priesthood. He wrote the story, screenplay & dialogues and directed it himself. He cast his niece Saroja as the titular character. The film was started in 1936 and released in 1937. The completed film was 19,000 feet (210 minutes runtime) in length.

Plot 
Sarasa's (K. R. Chellam) father is arrested by Police for being a debtor. She goes to the sub collector's (K. B. Vatsal) house to ask for help. The collector's widowed sister Janaki and her niece (Baby Saroja) take pity on her. They are driven out of the house by the angry collector. They take refuge in the house of their low-caste servant Munuswamy. Munuswamy dies and Janaki cares for his children as her own. This causes outrage in the conservative society and Munuswamy's house is burned down by a mob. The child Saroja changes everyone's mind with her arguments.

Tamil cast 

Male
 C. V. V. Panthulu as Munisamy
 Bharathan as Gopala Iyer
 K. B. Vatsal as Balachandra
 Salem Sundaram as Mahlinga Sastri
 Mani Bhagavathar
 Brahamdal

Female
 K. R. Chellam as Sarasa
 Baby Saroja as Saroja
 Bala Saraswathi as Kamala
 Baby Rukmini
 K. N. Rajalakshmi
 Seethalaksmi as Janaki

Telugu cast 
 Baby Saroja
 Baby S. Varalakshmi
 Arani Satyanarayana
 Vangara
 Kamala Kumari
 Thilakam

Soundtrack 
The music was by Moti Babu and the lyrics were Papanasam Sivan. ‘Kanney papa, kanimuthu paapa’, rendered by Baby Saroja as a lullaby to her doll, became popular.
 Kannae Paappa
 Kshamiyimpumaa O Maama Kshamiyimpumaa
 Radhey thozhi

Reception 
The film was released on 5 February 1937 to critical and public acclaim. "Baby" Saroja was hailed as "Shirley Temple of India". Many girls were named "Saroja" after her. The film's success inspired a number of socially themed films in South India.

Reviewing the film in the magazine Jaganmohini in February 1937, reviewer Vatsakumari wrote:

A similar review was written in Manikodi magazine in its February 1937 issue:

Film historian Theodore Baskaran has called it the most significant Tamil film of its period.

References

External links 
 
 

1937 films
1930s Tamil-language films
Indian black-and-white films
Films about children
Films directed by K. Subramanyam
1930s Telugu-language films
Films scored by Moti Babu
Films scored by Maruti Seetharammayya